Gogte Institute of Technology (GIT) is a college in Belgaum, Karnataka, India, which is An Autonomous institution affiliated to Visvesvaraya Technological University.

History
The college was founded in 1979 to meet the growing demand for technically-trained workers, being named after industrialist Raosaheb Gogte. It received the Excellent Technical Education Institute in Karnataka award at the August 9, 2014 National Karnataka Education Summit and Awards at Visvesvaraya Technological University in Bangalore.
 
Indian President Ram Nath Kovind inaugurated the platinum jubilee of Belgaum-based Karnataka Law Society and Raja Lakhmagouda Law College on September 15, 2018, and addressed a gathering at the institute. Karnataka Governor Vajubhai Vala, Chief Justice Dipak Mishra, Chief Minister H. D. Kumaraswamy, Supreme Court Judges Abdul Nazeer, Vineet Saran and Mohan Shantan Goudar, Attorney General K.K. Venugopal, MP Suresh Angadi, Karnataka Law Society president Anant Mandagi, and Chairman M. R. Kulkarni were also present.

Alumni
 Atul Chitnis, German born Indian consulting technologist and organizer of FOSS.in

References

External links 
 Gogte Institute of Technology

1979 establishments in Karnataka
Educational institutions established in 1979
Engineering colleges in Belgaum